Triphysaria eriantha is a species of flowering plant in the family Orobanchaceae, known by the common names johnny-tuck and butter-and-eggs.

It is native to California and southwestern Oregon, where it grows in many types of habitats including chaparral, becoming quite common in some areas.

Description
Triphysaria eriantha is an annual herb producing a hairy purple stem up to about 35 centimeters in maximum height. Like many species in its family, it is a facultative root parasite on other plants, attaching to their roots via haustoria to tap nutrients. Its green or purplish leaves are up to 5 centimeters long and are divided into a few narrow, pointed lobes.

The inflorescence is a spike of flowers. Each flower has a very thin, narrow upper lip which is purple in color, and a wide lower lip, which is divided into three pouches. The color of the pouches depends on the subspecies: the common ssp. eriantha has white and bright yellow pouches, and the less common coastal subsp. rosea has white pouches tinged with pink.

Gallery

References

External links
Jepson Manual (TJM93) Treatment of Triphysaria eriantha
UC Photos gallery: Triphysaria eriantha

Orobanchaceae
Flora of California
Flora of Oregon
Flora without expected TNC conservation status